Fahad Al-Deehani (born October 11, 1966) is a Kuwaiti professional target shooter and officer in the Kuwaiti military. He was born  in Kuwait City.

Olympic career 
Al-Deehani won a bronze medal for the men's double trap shooting event at the 2000 Summer Olympics, and won another bronze for the men's Olympic trap shooting event at the 2012 Summer Olympics.

At the 2016 Summer Olympics, Al-Deehani competed as an "independent Olympic athlete" because Kuwait was banned from the Olympics by the IOC. Al-Deehani called for the resignation of Kuwaiti officials responsible for the IOC ban, but refused to carry the Olympic flag in the 2016 Olympic opening ceremonies. Al-Deehani defeated Italian Marco Innocenti in the gold medal match of the men's double trap, becoming the first independent athlete to win a gold medal.

Other competitions 
In 2014, Al-Deehani won silver in the Asian Games double trap competition.

See also
 Kuwait at the 2000 Summer Olympics
 Kuwait at the 2012 Summer Olympics
 Kuwait at the 2016 Summer Olympics

References

External links
 

1966 births
Living people
Kuwaiti male sport shooters
Olympic shooters of Kuwait
Shooters at the 1992 Summer Olympics
Shooters at the 1996 Summer Olympics
Shooters at the 2000 Summer Olympics
Shooters at the 2004 Summer Olympics
Shooters at the 2012 Summer Olympics
Shooters at the 2016 Summer Olympics
Olympic gold medalists as Independent Olympic Participants
Olympic bronze medalists for Kuwait
Trap and double trap shooters
Asian Games medalists in shooting
Olympic medalists in shooting
Medalists at the 2012 Summer Olympics
Olympic shooters as Independent Olympic Participants
Shooters at the 1994 Asian Games
Shooters at the 1998 Asian Games
Shooters at the 2002 Asian Games
Shooters at the 2010 Asian Games
Shooters at the 2014 Asian Games
Sportspeople from Kuwait City
Medalists at the 2000 Summer Olympics
Medalists at the 2016 Summer Olympics
Asian Games gold medalists for Kuwait
Asian Games silver medalists for Kuwait
Asian Games bronze medalists for Kuwait
Medalists at the 1994 Asian Games
Medalists at the 1998 Asian Games
Medalists at the 2010 Asian Games
Medalists at the 2014 Asian Games